Swastika Mountain is a summit in Lane County, Oregon, in the United States. It is located within Umpqua National Forest.

The mountain took its name from the extinct town of Swastika, which was reportedly so named because a rancher there branded his cattle with the image of a swastika.

A fire lookout tower stood atop Swastika Mountain until the 1950s.

In August 2022, the Oregon Geographic Names Board confirmed that the name of the mountain would be changed, to avoid association with the Nazi Party. Two proposals for a new name, "Umpqua Mountain" (referring to the national forest which the mountain is located in) and "Mount Halo" (referring to Chief Halito, leader of the Yoncalla Kalapuya tribe), have been submitted.

References

Mountains of Lane County, Oregon
Mountains of Oregon